The Sri Lankan anti-Muslim riots were a series of religious riots targeting Muslims that began in the town of Ampara located in Sri Lanka on 26 February 2018, spreading to the Kandy District by March 2 until its end on March 10, 2018. 

Muslim citizens, mosques, and other properties were attacked by mobs of Sinhalese Buddhists. The Government of Sri Lanka undertook a forceful crackdown on the rioting by imposing a state of emergency and deploying the Sri Lankan Armed Forces to assist the Police in the affected areas. The situation was under control by 9 March. Two fatalities and ten injuries were reported among Sinhalese, Muslims, and Police. According to the police, forty-five incidents of damage to houses and businesses were reported, while four places of worship were attacked. The police arrested 81 persons in connection with the rioting.

Rioting in the Kandy District began in Udispattuwa and Teldeniya, later spreading to Digana, Tennekumbura, and other surrounding areas. It all began when a truck driver of Sinhalese ethnicity was assaulted by four Muslim youths following a traffic accident. The truck driver died of his injuries four days later. In response to this, on March 5, Sinhalese mobs began attacking Muslim properties in the region, resulting in widespread damage to property, luckily groups of local Sinhalese youth organized by Buddhist monks protected mosques from attackers. Cricketers Mahela Jayawardena, Kumar Sangakkara, and Sanath Jayasuriya condemned the attacks, and nearly 300 mostly Sinhalese volunteers rebuilt a Muslim business in Anamaduwa. The riots, the first large-scale Buddhist-Muslim sectarian violence since similar riots in 2014, prompted the Government of Sri Lanka to declare a State of Emergency for a period of ten days, in addition to the police curfew already imposed on the district. The state of emergency was the first such since 2011.

Social media networks including WhatsApp, Facebook, Twitter and Instagram were blocked in parts of the country in an effort to prevent mobs from organizing their attacks and spreading propaganda. However, the block on the social media networks was uplifted after 72 hours. After three days of raids in the main town of Kandy, at least 81 people were reported to have been arrested in connection with the incident by the Terrorism Investigation Division (TID) of the Sri Lankan police, including the main suspect Amith Jeevan Weerasinghe.  The police officers stated that the unusual situation which prevailed in the country for a few days had been brought under control, but tight security was imposed in a few parts of the nation as the predicted threats had been focused on the Muslim prayers on 9 March 2018. The riots were denounced by Buddhist monks, and many Sinhalese and Buddhist monks rallied to protect and help Muslims and Mosques during the prayers across the country. According to the Government, independent observers, Muslims and Sinhalese in the area, the majority of the rioters came from other areas of Sri Lanka to carry out the riots.

The government revealed that about nearly 465 houses, businesses and vehicles were destroyed and promised to compensate the families who were severely affected due to the communal violence.

A few weeks after the end of the anti-Muslim riots, new CCTV footage revealed that some police officials aided the rioters. Furthermore, politicians of former President Mahinda Rajapaksa's SLPP party were seen during the riots and claimed to be trying to calm the rioters, while the Government accused them of helping the rioters. Such activity caused for an investigation of the police officials.  It was confirmed that the deficiencies and ineffective attitudes of the police were to be investigated and questioned by the Sri Lankan government. Officials were later arrested on charges of torching a mosque but were granted bail after it was found that the alleged mosque was not torched.

Background 
Despite coexisting peacefully for the most part, many Sinhalese have a history of being suspicious of Muslims, believing that their slightly higher birth rates threaten their demographic supremacy, while others view Muslim businessmen as exploiting poor Sinhalese. Some political analysts believe that Sinhalese extremists are trying to transfer remaining hostility against Tamils onto the mostly Tamil-speaking Muslim population. Another factor is increasing Arab influence over Sri Lankan Muslim culture in recent years include the buildings of a large number of mosques using money coming from Arab countries and the adoption of the niqab by Muslim women which diverges from traditional dress in the area.

Sri Lanka has seen several communally violence charged incidents between the majority Sinhala community and the country's Muslim minority. Ampara District had experienced tensions since 2017, with Buddhist groups accusing Muslims of forced conversions and vandalising Buddhist archaeological sites.

The recent communal violence in Kandy is the first since the Black July violence which occurred in 1983 between Tamils and Sinhalese Buddhists. This violence is also the first time such communal violence has occurred between Muslims and Buddhists in the district of Kandy since the 1915 Ceylonese riots which was incited by the British administration.

Riots and Violence

Ampara 
An aggressive mob had openly ignited attacks on several shops in the surrounding area of Ampara. Hotels in the vicinity of the mosque were also attacked by the mobs, with the police unable to bring the situation under control. The Special Task Force and police reinforcements were then dispatched from nearby police stations which led to the mob dispersing.

Areas with larger Muslim populations in Maruthamunai, Sammanthurai, Akkaraipattu, Addalaichenai and Kalmunai in Ampara District were conducting Hartals, as response against the anti-Muslim riots. The protests resulted in 8 buses being damaged. 31 Muslims were arrested who were damaging public properties and released after warning.

Kandy District 
The first signs of violence were reported from Udispattuwa on the night of March 2  as the body of victim of Buddists targeted violence was being taken to Ambala, groups set tires alight on the road as a sign of protest against the killing; the police, anticipating violence, deployed 1000 Special Task Force personnel in and around the area, encompassing Moragahamula, Udispattuwa, Teldeniya and Ambagahalanda. Despite these efforts, two Muslim-owned shops in Moragahamula were subjected to arson on the night of 4 March, 28 suspects were later arrested for their involvement in the fires. General disorderly behaviour and violence associated with the killing by the residents of Teldeniya and outlying areas were also reported. 

The uproar began to spread to Digana by the morning of March 5, when a large mob converged on the town, setting fire to a mosque, shops and houses. In response, police used tear gas and water cannons in an attempt to disperse the crowd, which saw retaliation from the mob who threw various projectiles, while the violence spread to more residences, shops and nearby vehicles. Traffic along the A26 was forced to a halt, and by 3 PM, the police requested the support of the Sri Lanka Army, which deployed 200 troops from the Sinha Regiment base in Digana in the evening. The police then followed up by declaring a state of curfew district-wide in Kandy until 6 AM on 6 March; the same curfew was reimposed on Teldeniya and Pallekele at 8 PM on 6 March, after the body of a 24-year-old Muslim male was discovered within the remains of a shop in Digana. By the evening of 6 March, a total of 4 mosques, 37 houses, 46 shops and 35 vehicles were damaged or destroyed as a result of the riots in both Digana and other locations in the Kandy District; 1 confirmed fatality was reported.

On the night of March 6, mobs were seen in Lewella and Balagolla, moving towards Tennekumbura and the general direction of Kandy. Soon after, an arson attack on a mosque in Tennekumbura was reported.  Reports noted that on this day a Buddhist man dies after being beaten by a group of Muslim men who were upset over a traffic violation. According to sources, At 2 PM on 22 February 2018, a Sinhalese lorry driver from Ambala, Medamahanuwara was assaulted by four Muslim youths in Karaliyadda, Teldeniya. The victim was admitted to the intensive care unit of the Kandy General Hospital and died on the night of March 2 from his injuries. The victim's assistant (also traveling in the lorry) was assaulted, admitted to hospital, and later discharged after treatment.

The motive behind the attack has not been clearly established. Some reports state it stemmed from a road accident where the trucker had damaged the wing mirror of an auto rickshaw the assailants had been travelling in while attempting to overtake it; all four suspects were reported to have been intoxicated. The suspects were arrested by the Sri Lanka Police on the day of the attack and remanded until 7 March.High ambulance activity was reported from Menikhinna, and 7 people were arrested there for disorderly behavior and for causing unrest.  Three police officers were injured. he curfew put in place on the evening of 6 March was lifted briefly on the morning of the 7 of March, but soon reimposed. 7 March also saw Muslim residents of Mullegama barricading themselves inside a local mosque after a Sinhalese mob attacked their homes alleging theft of a donation box from a nearby Buddhist temple; the Muslims accused the police of inaction in the face of the mobs. One Sinhalese male was reported to have died and another injured in an explosion of unknown origin in the course of the Mullegama attacks. Some media reported his injuries sustained in an attack carried out by Muslim men. A reaction that a Buddhist monk at the Mullegama temple said was precipitated by a projectile attack against his temple by Muslims earlier in the day.

Katugastota also saw anti-Muslim violence and arson, while a mob assembled in the Ambatanna town center after a rumor that a temple was being attacked: the mob then proceeded to damage property and engaged in rioting.

Other districts 
Small incidents were reported in other districts against Muslims. A tire was burned in front mosque in Medina Nagar, Vavuniya. However, the police and army controlled the situation and protected the mosque. Some shops belonging to Muslims were damaged and some shop workers were assaulted in Ambatenna, Matale. A grenade blast left one dead. The following incident occurred despite a ban on social media networks designed to reduce the bloodshed.

Response 
Sri Lankan police arrested at least 81 rioters including Amith Jeevan Weerasinghe, the leader of the Sinhalese Buddhist Nationalist Mahason Balakaya who is believed to be the leading figure among the rioters alongside Suredha Suraweera who was also arrested. Ampitiye Sumanarathana Thera was also seen alongside Amith during the riot and also demanded the release of those arrested by the police but the thera was not arrested. Sumanarathana thera is known for his active participation in violence against Tamils and Muslims. Further the main suspects were brought to Colombo for further enquiries.

A panel of three retired judges are set to be appointed by the Sri Lankan President to probe into the anti-Muslim riots to inquire into the incidents which held in areas such as Digana, Teldeniya.

The newly appointed law and order minister, Ranjith Madduma Bandara stated that the current Sri Lankan government is planning to fresh legislation to ensure a code of conduct for the operation of social media networks in Sri Lanka in accordance with the international practices to avoid unethical false claims, rumours which have been spread by many suspicious people through social media. The minister also said that the law enforcement authorities and agencies have arrested people for conducting alleged hate campaigns regarding the ethnic riots between Muslims and Buddhists which prevailed in Kandy for about a week.

Poilce raided the Mahason Balakaya office at Naththaranpotha in Kundasale after interrogating Amith Weerasinghe which revealed bottles used to make petrol bombs as well as equipment and propaganda materials such as leaflets, posters, notices, letters, banners, a large number of documents and wristbands, which were used in propagating hate speech. Further the police found computer central processing units (CPUs), several bank accounts, bank slips and several vehicle permits.

Ampara 
Obstetricians and gynaecologists denied that pills can cause permanent sterility and stressed the need of surgical procedures such as vasectomy on males and tubal ligation surgery on females to cause permanent sterility. Director General of Health Services Dr. Anil Jasinghe also released a statement denying the existence of a method to sterilize a person through pills. Sri Lankan lecturer Dr. Mohamed Najimudeen from Melaka Manipal Medical College in Malaysia has also offered a prize of Rs. 1,000,000 to anyone able to prove sterilization medicines are being added to clothes or food in the country by various individuals. Health minister Rajitha Senaratne also claimed that there are no such medicines ever discovered to sterilize a male.

Dr. Razia Pendse, the World Health Organization representative in Sri Lanka issued a state claiming, "There is no medication or 'pills' currently known or available that can permanently make a human being sterile. The information on the use of an 'infertility pill' or 'sterilization pill' mixed with food is baseless with no scientific evidence". United Nations Population Fund Sri Lanka Representative Ritsu Nacken in her statement noted that the incidents show the lack of access to accurate reproductive health information in Sri Lanka.

Sociologists and senior lecturers at University of Sri Jayewardenepura's Department of Sociology and Anthropology, Dr. Praneeth Abeysundara and B.A. Tennyson Perera, called for authorities and media to create awareness and dialogues among community leaders and clerics to counter such paranoia.

On 8 March, the country's Government Analyst's Office confirmed the contents of particles alleged to be infertility/sterilization tablets were carbohydrate-based clumps of flour.

Kandy District 
The Government urged calm on 5 March, while the Ministry of Education ordered the closure of schools in the Kandy District. It also imposed a State of Emergency (the first since 2011) over the country on 6 March for a period of 10 days, granting the state powers to arrest and detain suspects indefinitely, and deploy armed forces at its will. The CID was tasked with an investigation into the event and its background.

The police came under heavy criticism for its failure to impose order and its alleged hesitation in preventing property damage at the start of the riots. Several government and opposition MPs criticized the police and its decision-making, while others called for calm and harsh punishments to perpetrators of racially motivated violence. A group of Sinhalese Buddhist citizens and Buddhist clergy held a protest outside the Digana police station on 6 March demanding the release of all suspects arrested for their involvement in the riots. The government and the opposition party Janatha Vimukthi Peramuna alleged an organized, political effort to inflame sectarian tensions in Kandy. The Bodu Bala Sena, at the center of the 2014 riots, accused the public of unfairly linking it to incidents of communal violence in the country as BBS was earlier accused and criticised by the critics and other political leaders for aggravating the violence between Muslims and Buddhists, which was later revealed that Bodu Bala Sena was unnecessarily blamed for the incident. BBS Secretary General Galagoda Aththe Gnanasara visited the assault victim's home on 4 March, and claimed he had urged residents of the area to remain calm.

In an effort to prevent mobs from organizing online through social media platforms, internet access to the Kandy District was restricted by order of the Telecommunications Regulatory Commission (TRC). Access to Facebook was blocked, and the Ministry of Defence instructed the TRC to report on individuals spreading hate speech on social media platforms. The Centre for Policy Alternatives, a think-tank based in Colombo, released a statement claiming videos containing "false information" that sought to incite sectarian violence were going viral online.

Following the violence in Kandy, several foreign tourists have cancelled their visits to the historic Kandy town. This was evident despite the attempts taken by the Sri Lanka Tourism Development Authority to provide further updates to the foreign tourists about the country's current situation. But the Sri Lanka Tourism Development Authority stated that Kandy is returning to the normal situation and foreign tourists could resume their visits to the country.

The riots affected both Sinhalese and Muslim communities in the areas with businesses run by Sinhalese in properties rented from Muslims being also burned by the mobs. After the riots ended citizens of Balagalla joined to help the Muslims affected by the riots. Pathadumbara Thalpotha Dhammajothi Thera the Chief Incumbent of the Balagolla Viharaya organized efforts to provide dry rations to Muslim families displaced due to riots. Many Buddhist monks also visited Muslim churches during the Friday prayers in 9 March to express solidarity with Muslims. An organization with the name, Citizens Against Racism has staged a peaceful protests on 8 March 2018 to combat ethnic minority violence in the country. Hundreds of Buddhists monks from the National Bhikku Front also launched a peaceful protest in Colombo accusing the rioters of destroying national unity.

In addition Sinhalese and Buddhist volunteers actively participated in reconstruction efforts and one Muslim owned eatery which was set ablaze by rioters was repaired by over 300 volunteers with around 200 being Sinhalese within 12 hours attracting media attention

The schools in the administrative Kandy District were re-opened on 12 March 2018 (Monday) following the gradual improvement in Kandy after the communal violence. The schools had been closed for about one week since 5 March 2018 due to the imposition of the state of emergency.

International response
Australia, Denmark, Norway, the United Kingdom and the United States issued travel advisories warning their citizens to remain vigilant, avoid large crowds and protests, and to follow instructions by local authorities.

 Turkey: The Turkish Ministry of Foreign Affairs released a statement that expressed concerns over the violence, saying "the Sri Lankan government will take the necessary steps to ensure that different religious and ethnic communities continue to live together in peace across the country." The ministry also offered condolences to the families of victims killed in the riots.
 United Nations: The UN condemned the attacks, calling for a quick resolution of the situation in a statement released on 7 March. "The United Nations urges authorities to take immediate action against perpetrators and to ensure that appropriate measures are swiftly taken to restore normalcy in affected areas". UN spokesperson Stephane Dujarric said, "We are obviously concerned over reports of the ongoing communal violence and we welcome the government's commitment to addressing the tensions and achieve reconciliation. We urge all Sri Lankans to resolve their difference through dialogue."
 United States: The Administration urged the Government of Sri Lanka act quickly against perpetrators of sectarian violence, in a statement released on 6 March. "Rule of law, human rights, and equality are essential for peaceful coexistence. It is important that the Government of Sri Lanka act quickly against perpetrators of sectarian violence, protect religious minorities and their places of worship, and conclude the State of Emergency swiftly, while protecting human rights and basic freedoms for all".
 European Union: In a statement made on 8 March, the EU urged the government to take urgent action against hate crimes. "The recent attacks on communities are very worrying. It is important that the Government and the security forces take urgent action against hate crimes and ensure that the perpetrators of such actions are swiftly brought to justice. It is vital that all political leaders, religious and other community leaders condemn violence and make every effort to promote understanding and harmony between communities. The EU trusts that any actions taken under the State of Emergency will be proportionate and respect constitutional rights and freedoms".
 Canada: The Government of Canada called on the Sri Lankan Government to ensure the safety and security of all minorities. "Canada welcomes the Government of Sri Lanka’s condemnation of the violent acts. Canada calls on the government to ensure the safety and security of all minorities, to protect human rights and fundamental freedoms for all and to hold those responsible for the violence accountable. As we said at the United Nations Human Rights Council last month, frustrations persist among those trying to heal the wounds of Sri Lanka’s civil war. Ensuring that diversity and pluralism are valued is critical to the work of reconciliation in Sri Lanka".
 China: The Government of China stated on 8 March that it believes the Government of Sri Lankan and its people are capable of handling the current situation. "We have noted relevant reports. This belongs to Sri Lanka's internal affairs. China believes that the Sri Lankan government and its people are capable of handling the current situation, and upholding Sri Lanka's social stability and ethnic solidarity. We also hope that Sri Lanka will take concrete measures to protect the security of Chinese citizens in Sri Lanka".

Celebrity response
Sri Lankan cricketers including Kumar Sangakkara, Mahela Jayawardene and Sanath Jayasuriya strongly condemned the situation, and asked the populace to come together to unite the country. Former Sri Lankan cricketer Muttiah Muralitharan said that his family members were feeling safe in Kandy and also said that there was no need to worry about the country following the declaration of the state of emergency.

Former Sri Lankan president, Mahinda Rajapaksa accused and blamed the government for not acting in a more responsive manner to control the ethnic riots. He further mentioned that some cabinet ministers tried to blame the police officials rather than being responsible to control and manage the unusual situation which has spread in the nation. Further, Mahinda Rajapaksa has also been reported to have met the heads of diplomatic missions of few Islamic countries in order to discuss about the communal violence which erupted in the nation a few weeks ago. In addition, he also went onto visit Kandy on 9 March 2018 to discuss about the current situation in the area following the violence.

Indian test cricketer, Ravichandran Ashwin has also deeply expressed his condolences and disarray towards the people of Sri Lanka and pointed out that Sri Lankan people of any cast are generally good. He further mentioned in his Twitter account, Sri Lanka would become great again after sometime. Human rights activist, Meenakshi Ganguly from India has also warned the Sri Lankan government for not taking immediate actions to eradicate communal violences in the nation.

Economic impact 
The riots negatively impacted the economy of Sri Lanka as well as the local economy of Kandy. In addition to the destruction of many shops employing both Sinhalese and Muslims many tourists cancelled visits to Sri Lanka which heavily depends on the tourism industry.

The violence in Kandy affected the Nuwara Eliya season in April where there was a 40% drop in tourist arrivals both local and foreign compared to the last year. Tourism Development Minister John Amaratunga planned to invite Ambassadors of the various countries that imposed travel advisories with a site visit for diplomats mainly from the European and Middle Eastern nations on 13–14 May with cultural events and tours to assure them about the country returning to normalcy.

Other events 
 The opening match of the 2018 Nidahas Trophy, a Tri-Series cricket tournament between Sri Lanka and India was held under tight security coinciding with the tense situation in the nation following the declaration of the state of emergency.
 Despite the violence between Muslims and Buddhists in the island, the funeral of Daranagama Kusaladhamma Thero was held on 8 March 2018 in Colombo.

References

External links 
 

2018 in Islam
2018 in Sri Lanka
2018 riots
Ethnic riots
February 2018 crimes in Asia
History of Ampara District
History of Kandy District
March 2018 crimes in Asia
Anti-Islam sentiment in Sri Lanka
Persecution by Buddhists
Religious riots
Riots and civil disorder in Sri Lanka
2018 crimes in Sri Lanka